Martin O'Connor may refer to:

Martin O'Connor (footballer) (born 1967), English former football and manager
Martin John O'Connor (1900–1986), American prelate of the Roman Catholic Church
Máirtín O'Connor, Irish button accordionist

See also
Martin Connor, former member of the New York State Senate